Mount Carmel A.M.E. Zion Church & Campground is a historic African Methodist Episcopal Zion camp meeting grounds in Heath Springs, South Carolina, Lancaster County, South Carolina.  It was established in 1866 and consists of a complex of approximately 55 small "cabins" or "tents" and the brick church of Mt. Carmel A.M.E. Zion Church is located in the general form of a rectangle. Mount Carmel A.M.E Zion Church Campmeeting starts every year on the first Wednesday in September, and last for 4–5 days. An "arbor," or open-air structure, is located in the center of the complex, where music, gospel singing, praise and worship, preaching and teachings are held. People come to worship, fellowship, network, and eat food from as far as New York City, NY to Orlando, FL. There is also a section on the grounds for vendors. The majority of the cabins are small frame, some are two story cabins for larger families made from concrete block and wooden structures. Also on the property is the church cemetery.

It was added to the National Register of Historic Places in 1979.

See also 
 Camp Welfare: AME Zion camp meeting ground in Fairfield County, South Carolina
 Cattle Creek Campground: United Methodist camp meeting ground in Orangeburg County, South Carolina
 Cypress Camp Ground: Methodist camp meeting ground in Dorchester County, South Carolina
 Indian Fields Campground: Methodist camp meeting ground in Dorchester County, South Carolina
 St. Paul Camp Ground: AME camp meeting ground in Dorchester County, South Carolina

References

African-American history of South Carolina
Methodism in South Carolina
Churches on the National Register of Historic Places in South Carolina
Churches completed in 1866
19th-century Methodist church buildings in the United States
Buildings and structures in Lancaster County, South Carolina
National Register of Historic Places in Lancaster County, South Carolina
1866 establishments in South Carolina
African Methodist Episcopal Zion Church
Campgrounds in South Carolina
Camp meeting grounds